William Johnston may refer to:

Military
William Henry Johnston (1879–1915), Scottish recipient of the Victoria Cross
William J. Johnston (1918–1990), American soldier and Medal of Honor recipient
William Preston Johnston (1831–1899), lawyer, scholar, poet, and Confederate soldier
Willie Johnston (Medal of Honor) (1850–?), drummer boy in Company D of the 3rd Vermont Infantry
William Johnston (British Army officer)
William Wallace Stewart Johnston (1887–1962), Australian soldier and medical doctor
William Johnston Jr. (1861–1933), American military officer
William P. Johnston, American sailor and recipient of the Medal of Honor

Politics
William Johnston (Australian politician) (1829–1894), one of the Members of the New South Wales Legislative Assembly, 1874–1877
William Johnston (Canadian politician) (1876–1925), Labour MLA for Medicine Hat, 1921–1926
William Johnston (congressman) (1819–1866), U.S. Representative from Ohio
William Johnston (Irish politician) (1829–1902), Irish politician and Orangeman
William Johnston (judge) (1804–1891), judge, legislator and bureaucrat from Ohio
William Johnston (Lord Provost) (1802–1888), Scottish map publisher and Lord Provost of Edinburgh
William Ernest George Johnston (1884–1951), Lord Mayor of Belfast
William Erskine Johnston (1905–1993), Canadian politician
William F. Johnston (1808–1872), governor of Pennsylvania, 1848–1852
 William Agnew Johnston (1848–1937), American politician in Kansas
William Johnston (senator), President pro tempore of the California State Senate

Religion
William Johnston (minister) (1921–2005), Moderator of the General Assembly of the Church of Scotland
Frank Johnston (priest) (William Francis Johnston, born 1930), Anglican priest and military chaplain
William Johnston (bishop) (1914–1986), of Dunwich

Sports
William Johnston (athlete) (born 1964), Paralympic athlete from Ireland
William Johnston (cricketer) (1867–1947), New Zealand cricketer
William E. Johnston, American football player and coach of football, basketball and baseball
Willie Johnston (born 1946), Scottish former footballer
Wade Johnston (William Wade Johnston, 1898–1978), American baseball player
Delirious (wrestler) (William Hunter Johnston, born 1980), professional wrestler
Massa Johnston (William Johnston, 1881–1951), New Zealand rugby union and rugby league representative
William Johnston (English rugby union), played in 1910 Five Nations Championship
William Johnston (footballer) from List of Northern Ireland international footballers
William Johnston (ice hockey) in Manitoba Hockey Hall of Fame

Others
William Johnston (painter) (1732–1772), colonial American painter
William Johnston (novelist) (1924–2010), American novelist
William Johnston of Liverpool (1841–1917), early benefactor of the University of Liverpool, Liverpool, England
William Andrew Johnston (1871–1929), American journalist and author
William Campbell Johnston (1860–1938), Scottish lawyer and cricketer
Will Johnston (William Michael Johnston, born 1936), American historian
William N. Johnston, 16th president of Wesley College (Delaware)
William L. Johnston (1811–1849), carpenter-architect in Philadelphia
William Johnston (producer) from Canadian Screen Award for Best Motion Picture
William Johnston (screenwriter) of The Truth About Love
William Johnston (editor) from Edward Quillinan
William Johnston (mariner) from Johnston Passage

See also
Bill Johnston (disambiguation)
William Johnson (disambiguation)
William Johnstone (disambiguation)